General Directorate of Public Security, formerly General Directorate of Police, are the civilian police force under the Ministry of Interior responsible for law enforcement in Saudi Arabia.

Sections

 Special Tasks And Duties
 Traffic department
 Police department
 Department of research and investigation
 Criminal evidence department

Special Forces 
There are forces report to the General Directorate of Public Security. These are as follows:

Roads security special forces.
 Diplomatic security special forces.
 Emergency special forces.
Hajj and Umrah special forces.

Sources
 ministry of interior 
 directorate of general security:ministry of interior

References

Ministry of Interior (Saudi Arabia)
Law enforcement in Saudi Arabia